Paradise Hill is an unincorporated community in Milton Township, Ashland County, in the U.S. state of Ohio.

History
A post office called Paradise Hill was established in 1878, and remained in operation until 1907. In 1941, Paradise Hill had about 10 inhabitants.

References

Unincorporated communities in Ashland County, Ohio
1878 establishments in Ohio
Populated places established in 1878
Unincorporated communities in Ohio